Wilbur Summers (August 6, 1954 – November 1, 2019) was an American football punter. He played for the Detroit Lions in 1977.

He died on November 1, 2019, in Louisville, Kentucky at age 65.

References

1954 births
2019 deaths
American football punters
Louisville Cardinals football players
Detroit Lions players
People from Irvington, New Jersey
Players of American football from New Jersey
Sportspeople from Essex County, New Jersey
Miami Norland Senior High School alumni
Players of American football from Miami